Beirut Club is a basketball team based in Beirut, Lebanon, who plays in the Lebanese Basketball League (LBL), the top-flight of basketball in Lebanon. Home games are played in the Chiyah Stadium.

The club was first promoted to the Lebanese Basketball League in 2017, and has played there ever since.  The club won their first LBL championship in 2022, defeating Al Riyadi in the final. Beirut Club has also been the runners-up of the Arab Championship twice, with consecutive finals in 2018 and 2019.

Beirut Club also has a professional women's team.

Squad

Honours

Domestic competitions 
 Lebanese Basketball League
 Champions (1): 2021–22
 Runners-up (1): 2018–19

Lebanese Cup
Champions (1): 2021–22

International competitions 
 Arab Club Basketball Championship
  (2): 2018, 2019
  (1): 2022

 Dubai International Basketball Tournament 
  (1) : 2019

References

External links
 Official Facebook

2015 establishments in Lebanon
Basketball teams established in 2015
Basketball teams in Lebanon
Sport in Beirut